Glass and Butner was an architectural partnership of Edward Francis Glass and Charles Edgar Butner based in Fresno, California.  It operated from 1914 to around 1922. The two developed a proposal for a design competition for the Veterans' Memorial Building.  Several of their works are listed on the National Register of Historic Places (NRHP).

Glass (March 8, 1885 - January 31, 1954) was born in San Francisco and grew up in Fresno, where he attended Fresno High School.  He worked as a draftsman for two architectural firms in Philadelphia.
He achieved a Certificate of Proficiency in Architecture in 1912, perhaps in Pennsylvania or perhaps in California.

Butner (July 31, 1888 - June 10, 1957) was born in Pennsylvania.
He served in World War I as a pilot in the United States Army Air Service.

In 1922 there was some controversy, involving an article published as an interview, and statement of a member of the firm not being certified as an architect.  Glass denounced the article in a letter to the Western Architect and Engineer.

Works by the firm include:

Fresno Republican Printery Building (1919), 2130 Kern St., Fresno, CA (Butner, Charles; Glass, Edward), NRHP-listed
Physicians Building (1926), 2607 Fresno St., Fresno, CA (Butner, Charles E.), NRHP-listed
Twining Laboratories, 2527 Fresno St., Fresno, CA (Butner, Charles E.), NRHP-listed

Butner separately worked with Robert Stanton around 1936.

References

Architects from California
Fresno, California